Angel Tasevski (born October 17, 1981) is a former Macedonian professional basketball point guard who last played for Karpoš Sokoli in the Macedonian First League.

References

External links
 Eurobasket profile
 Realgm.com profile

1981 births
Living people
Macedonian men's basketball players
Place of birth missing (living people)
Point guards